Janith is both a given name and a surname. 

Notable people with the given name include:
Janith Liyanage (born 1995), Sri Lankan cricketer
Janith Pathirage (born 1990), Sri Lankan book reviewer
Janith Silva (born 1990), Sri Lankan cricketer

Notable people with the surname include:
Buddika Janith (born 1989) is a Sri Lankan cricketer

Sinhalese masculine given names